ELAS, also known as the Greek People's Liberation Army, was a World War II Greek Resistance group.

ELAS or Elas can also refer to:
The Equitable Life Assurance Society, a life insurance company in the United Kingdom
Elas, a planet in the Star Trek episode "Elaan of Troyius"

See also 
 Ellas (disambiguation)
 Ela (disambiguation)